Marinobacter zhanjiangensis is a Gram-negative, aerobic and non-spore-forming bacterium from the genus of Marinobacter which has been isolated from tidal flat from the water from the South China Sea near the Naozhou Island in China.

References

External links
Type strain of Marinobacter zhanjiangensis at BacDive -  the Bacterial Diversity Metadatabase	

Alteromonadales
Bacteria described in 2012